Marius Mondelé (12 December 1913 – 7 February 1981) was a Belgian footballer. He played in four matches for the Belgium national football team from 1935 to 1936.

References

External links
 

1913 births
1981 deaths
Belgian footballers
Belgium international footballers
Association football midfielders
People from Molenbeek-Saint-Jean
Footballers from Brussels